Michael Huppe is a music industry executive and attorney who serves as president and CEO of SoundExchange, a non-profit collective rights management organization that provides technology solutions to make the business of music easier and advocates for fair music royalty compensation on behalf of its community of 570,000 creators. In his decade as SoundExchange CEO he has been a leader in driving the modernization of the music industry into the streaming era.

Career
Huppe began his career as a commercial litigator and joined SoundExchange as its General Counsel in 2007, where he is now President and CEO. Huppe, who has been named multiple times to Billboard's Power 100 List, helped lead efforts for the passage of the Music Modernization Act, which was passed by Congress in 2018.

In 2015, Huppe led a “contentious” effort to raise the rates music streaming companies pay to performers and creators for use of their work. The case went before the Copy Royalty Board. Huppe claimed the difference in proposed rates between existing industry standards and rates SoundExchange proposed could amount to up to $5 billion over a five-year period.

Huppe is a member of the Community Advisory Board of The John F. Kennedy Center for the Performing Arts and on the National Board of Trustees for T.J. Martell Foundation.

Education
Huppe received his bachelor's degree from the University of Virginia in 1990 and a JD from Harvard Law School in 1995.

Personal
Huppe lives in Fairfax County, Virginia with his wife Maria, their beloved two children, and two dogs, Lulu and Murphy.

References

1968 births
Living people
American music industry executives
University of Virginia alumni
Harvard Law School alumni